Wakool is a town in New South Wales, Australia

Wakool may also refer to:
Wakool (ship), a ship of the Blue Anchor Line, which entered service in 1898
Wakool River, an anabranch of the Edward River in the western Riverina region of south western New South Wales, Australia
Wakool Shire, formerly a local government area in the Riverina region of New South Wales, Australia
Wakool County, a cadastral divisions of New South Wales